Hlince is a municipality and village in Plzeň-North District in the Plzeň Region of the Czech Republic. It has about 70 inhabitants. The village is well preserved and is protected by law as a village monument zone.

References

Villages in Plzeň-North District